Kalqa'il is an angel in Islam, who guards the entrance of the fifth heaven and governs the houris. He is also invoked in exorcist rites.

See also
 List of angels in theology

References

Angels in Islam
Individual angels
Exorcism in Islam